Scopula fuscobrunnea is a moth of the family Geometridae. It was described by Warren in 1901. It is found in Cameroon and Kenya.

References

Moths described in 1901
fuscobrunnea
Moths of Africa
Taxa named by William Warren (entomologist)